ZNAK Ltd. –  is a Ukrainian manufacturer of plastic payment cards, document application forms and polycarbonate pages for passports, etc. Located in Kyiv. A member of the Ukrainian EDAPS Consortium.

History 

 December 2004 – became a member of International Card Manufacturers Association (ICMA) and Fogra Graphic Technology Research Association (FOGRA).
 July 2005 – launch of enterprise's production activity
 January 2006 – the enterprise started manufacturing national plastic driving licenses and vehicle registration certificates in Ukraine.
 June 2007 – start of the manufacture of polycarbonate pages for new travel passports within framework of implementation of state program.

2008 

 February 2008 – won tender to supply Visa Electron plastic cards to the second largest bank in the Republic of Belarus JSC Belagroprombank, as well the tender to supply many millions of plastic cards to Russia's MCB Moscomprivatbank.
 April 2008 – proceeded to manufacture polymeric pages for De Beers passports of jewelry.
The Quality Management System of ZNAK Ltd. is certified in accordance with the requirements of international standard ISO 9001:2000 and in the system UkrSEPRO in compliance with Ukrainian state standard DSTU ISO 9001-2001.

2009 

 October 2009 – became the first Ukrainian manufacturer of payment cards with Sagem Orga chip. These chips are used for bank plastic cards of the Visa and Mastercard International payment systems as well as for the national UkrCard system.
 October 2009 – the EDAPS Consortium was selected as the manufacturer of e-Passports and ID-cards for INTERPOL officers. Within the scope of this project ZNAK manufactures polycarbonate pages for passports and plastic cards.
 December 2009 –audits carried out confirmed the Quality Management System of enterprise is in accordance with the requirements of the international and national standards ISO 9001

2010 

 April 2010 – delegation from the National Academy of Sciences of Ukraine headed by  President of the NASU, Borys Paton
 September 2010 – the enterprise introduced new solutions for design of bank cards, namely custom-designed cards, even aromatized (chocolate and citruses)
 September 2010 – The National Bank of Ukraine awarded the enterprise as the winner in the nomination The Best Manufacturer of Cards for NSMEP. NSMEP – National System of Mass Electronic Payments

Certificates and licenses 

The enterprise is a certified manufacturer of plastic cards, including chip cards for the Mastercard Worldwide and Visa Inc. international payment systems, and the UrkCard payment system. The Quality Management System of the enterprise is certified in accordance with the requirements of the international standard ISO 9001:2000 and in the system UkrSEPRO in compliance with the state standards of Ukraine DSTU ISO 9001-2001. Licenses: from the Ministry of Finance of Ukraine and the Security Service of Ukraine.

Membership of organizations 

 International Card Manufacturers Association ICMA.
 Graphic Technology Research Association FOGRA
 Ukrainian Interbank Association of the Members of Payment Systems ЕМА.
 Kyiv Chamber of Commerce and Industry and Ukrainian Chamber of Commerce and Industry.

Products 

 Plastic application forms for identification documents (including electronic documents with contactless chip), polycarbonate pages for passports
 Payment cards of VISA and MasterCard international payment systems, the National System of Mass Electronic Payments (NSMEP), UkrCard, Belcards: cards with chips and/or magnetic strip
 Cards for operators of cellular communications
 Other types of discount cards

As a member of the EDAPS Consortium, the ZNAK Ltd. participates in state programs on the issuance of travel passports with a polycarbonate page, national driving licenses and vehicle registration certificates. The enterprise manufactures the majority of chip cards of the National System of Mass Electronic Payments (NSMEP). The enterprise produced over 38.6 million payment cards for Ukrainian and foreign banks as of July 1, 2010. The manufacturing premises of the enterprise occupy a territory of 4,500 sq. m. The enterprise created a laboratory for testing cards on compliance with international and national standards.

Manufacturing capacity of the enterprise:

 100 million payment cards annually
 3 million polycarbonate pages for passports annually

External links 
 official site of ZNAK Ltd.

References 

Manufacturing companies based in Kyiv
Ukrainian companies established in 2004